Binibining Pilipinas 1996 was the 33rd edition of Binibining Pilipinas. It took place at the Araneta Coliseum in Quezon City, Metro Manila, Philippines on March 24, 1996.
 
At the end of the event, Joanne Santos crowned Aileen Damiles as Binibining Pilipinas Universe 1996, Caroline Subijano, Binibining Pilipinas World 1994, crowned Daisy Reyes as Binibining Pilipinas World 1996, and Gladys Dueñas crowned Yedda Marie Mendoza as Binibining Pilipinas International 1996. Maria Sovietskaya Bacud was named First Runner-Up, while Sonia Santiago was named Second Runner-Up.

Results
 
Color keys
  The contestant was a Semi-Finalist in an International pageant.
  The contestant did not place but won a Special Award in the pageant.

Special Awards

Contestants
36 contestants competed for the three titles.

Notes

Post-pageant Notes 

 Aileen Damiles competed at Miss Universe 1996 in Las Vegas, Nevada and was unplaced. However, she won the Miss Photogenic Award via the internet. Daisy Reyes was also unplaced when she competed at Miss World 1996 in Bangalore, India, but was awarded the Miss Personality award.
 Yedda Marie Mendoza competed at Miss International 1996 in Kanazawa, Japan, and was one of the 15 semifinalists.
 Maria Teresita Legacion competed at Mutya ng Pilipinas 1996, and was named Second Runner-Up. Legacion then became Mutya ng Pilipinas-Tourism International 1996.

References 
 

 

1996
1996 beauty pageants